Jay Schottenstein (born 1954) is an entrepreneur from Columbus, Ohio. He is the chairman and CEO of Schottenstein Stores Corporation, American Eagle Outfitters, and American Signature. He is the Executive Chairman of Designer Brands.

Early life
Schottenstein was born and raised in Columbus, Ohio to a Jewish family, the son of Geraldine (née Hurwitz) and Jerome Schottenstein. His father, uncles, and grandfather established Schottenstein Stores Corporation. Schottenstein graduated from Indiana University Bloomington in 1976.

Career 
In 1976, Schottenstein began working in his father's business, joining Value City Furniture.

Schottenstein became chairman of American Eagle Outfitters in 1992 and held the position of CEO from 1992 to 2002, and since December 2015. In 1993, after his father's death, he replaced his father as head of Schottenstein Stores Corporation. Since 2005, he has served as chairman of DSW.

Schottenstein oversees a network of businesses that include American Eagle Outfitters (NYSE:AEO), Designer Brands (NYSE:DBI), American Signature and Value City Furniture, SB360 Capital Partners and Schottenstein Property Group.

Personal life 
Jay Schottenstein is married to Jeanie Schottenstein (née Rabe). Schottenstein is a philanthropist and gives to local, national, and international charities.

References

External links
Forbes article (Broken Link)
Yeshiva University news
"The Wasteland" on Forbes
Jay L. Schottenstein - Honorary Director

Living people
American businesspeople in retailing
20th-century American Jews
1955 births
21st-century American Jews